Laveno-Mombello railway station is a railway station in Italy. It is junction of the lines Luino–Milan and Luino–Oleggio. It serves the town of Laveno-Mombello, and is joined by a junction track to the Laveno-Mombello Lago railway station, managed by Ferrovienord.

Services 
 the following services stop at Porto Valtravaglia:

Until December 2013 there were also a few regional trains to Novara, operated by the Italian railway company Trenitalia.

References

External links 
 
 Laveno-Mombello – RFI

Railway stations in Lombardy
Railway stations opened in 1882